Johan Lars Blomberg (born 14 June 1987) is a Swedish professional footballer who plays as a right midfielder for Trelleborgs FF.

Club career
Blomberg joined Colorado Rapids in November 2017.

On 31 January 2021, Blomberg signed a two-year contract with Trelleborg.

Career statistics

References

External links

Living people
1987 births
Swedish footballers
Swedish expatriate footballers
Sportspeople from Lund
Association football midfielders
Lunds BK players
Ängelholms FF players
Halmstads BK players
AIK Fotboll players
Colorado Rapids players
GIF Sundsvall players
Trelleborgs FF players
Superettan players
Allsvenskan players
Major League Soccer players
Expatriate soccer players in the United States
Swedish expatriate sportspeople in the United States